Tanner is an unincorporated community in Center Township, Greene County, Indiana, United States.

History
Tanner was named for John Riley Tanner, an Illinois politician. A post office was established at Tanner in 1889, and remained in operation until it was discontinued in 1906.

References

Unincorporated communities in Greene County, Indiana
Unincorporated communities in Indiana